Lightware Visual Engineering (or simply Lightware) is a Hungarian privately owned company, manufacturer and distributor of audiovisual automation and integration equipment based in Budapest, Hungary, founded in 1998. Lightware is Europe's largest manufacturer of AV management products in both fixed installation market areas (e.g. in theaters, in the entertainment industry, for medical applications, in the education sector, in smart homes as well as for all types of corporate applications such as collaboration and conferencing) and in the extensive segment of live events. Since its founding numerous projects have been planned and carried out in many countries around the world. For instance, solutions from Lightware can be found among the teams that broadcast the Olympic Games, power the Eurovision Song Contest or executed the Expo 2020 in Dubai. The company develops and produces all products at the headquarters in Budapest, Hungary. The company is privately owned by the founder Árpád Gergely Vida. To this day he is CEO and head of the development department.

History 
Lightware was founded by Árpád Gergely Vida, Miklós Debreczeni, Attila Nagy and György Németh in 1998. In its early years, two employees worked for the company, and they repaired only projectors and plasma TVs.

In 2006 the engineers of Lightware invented the EDID Manager as the very first product, helping the users to handle the different predefined video signal resolutions. After this, the company appeared at the ISE exhibition in Brussels, Belgium. A year later, the first hybrid eight-input and eight-output fully digital video-multiplexer matrix supporting HD resolution, the 32x32 DVI and HDMI Matrix Switcher was completed. This device eliminated the need for multiple devices by combining DVI and HDMI connectivity ports on a large crosspoint size.

In 2011 Lightware opened its first two offices outside Hungary, in the United Kingdom and in the United States of America, two years later followed by the ones in Australia, Italy and Singapore, and in 2015 in the Netherlands, India and in the Middle East. The same year the company introduced the Event Manager, a Room Automation tool that simplifies system configuration, while significantly reduces the need for complex programming.

In 2017 they introduced the UBEX 10G AV-over-IP System, the world's first solution to deliver the benefits of traditional AV devices such as zero frame latency and pixel-perfect video signals. It was 2020, when Lightware announced the arrival of the Taurus UCX, using USB-C technology to send video, audio, control and Ethernet signals through a single cable for enhanced collaborations.

Activity 
Lightware focuses on audiovisual technology, develops and manufactures high-quality data transmission devices, all of which is solved by 4K video signal transmission without any degradation or delay. The products of the company are used in rental events, such as concerts and shows of Billie Eilish, the Cirque du Soleil or Rod Stewart.

Lightware is Europe's biggest AV manufacturer company. The product range includes AV-over-IP products, presentation switchers, HDMI switchers and extenders. The Taurus UCX range offers the latest technology for boardrooms incorporating USB-C, HID USB, room control and video distribution and switching with Cisco certified class leading technology.

High-tech meeting room systems that support hybrid work are also operated with the company's devices, for example at Google, Microsoft, Apple, Netflix or Facebook, where the entire control and automation of the meeting rooms, the power, turning on and off of the lighting can be solved from a single touch screen. In addition, Lightware's products can be found in 3D simulation rooms of car factories, in the controls of oil platforms, in the control centers of well-known buildings, as well as on airplanes, yachts and submarines.

The company develops and manufactures all its products at its headquarters in Budapest. Since the company has offices and distribution points worldwide, more than 99% of sales revenue comes from export.

Lightware is member of the SDVoE Alliance, dedicated to delivering best-in-the-industry products and solutions and helping professionals get the most value from SDVoE technology.

Product lines 
 Taurus UCX
 UBEX (Ultra Bandwidth Extender)
 VINX (Video Network Extender)
 TPX extenders
 MX2 series
 MX2M series
 MX series
 USB-C cables
 MODEX
 Event Manager
 Lightware software

Sales network 
The company has opened offices on four continents so far. In the countries, where Lightware hasn't established an office yet, they allot the products thanks to the distribution network, or serve the customers by the HQ from Budapest, Hungary.

Lightware offices:

Awards 
 Brand of the Year – Taurus UCX (PROAV Award 2021)
 Informatization AV Industry Annual List – Lightware China (AV Industry Award 2021–2022)
 Best of Show Award: AV Technology – Taurus UCX (ISE 2022)
 Event Technology of the Year – UBEX (AV Awards 2022)
 Collaboration Technology of the Year – Taurus UCX (AV Awards 2022)
 Best of Show Award: AV Technology – UBEX (ISE 2023)
 Best of Show Award: Tech and Learning – VINX (ISE 2023)

References

External links 
 Official Website
 Facebook page of Lightware
 Twitter page of Lightware
 Lightware Skill for Webex Assistant

Manufacturing companies based in Budapest
Manufacturing companies established in 1998
Home automation companies
Building automation
Remote control
Video equipment manufacturers